The kingdom or polity of Vungu was a historic mini-state located on the north bank of the Congo River near the modern day town of Matadi in the Democratic Republic of Congo.  In the sixteenth century its name was written as "Bungu" reflecting the ambiguity of b/v/bh in Kikongo.

History
It is not known for sure how old Vungu was or when it was founded.  The first documentary mention of it comes in a letter written by Afonso I,the king of Kongo in 1535, in which he lists "JBungu" among other places over which he ruled as king.  Traditions collected in the Kongo court and written up by the Jesuit priest Mateus Cardoso in 1624 cite "Bungu" as the place where the first king of Kongo ruled before crossing the Congo River to conquer Kongo.  That same year, King Pedro II of Kongo mentioned that the place had been overrun and destroyed by Jagas, the generic term in documents of the period for rootless militant bands reputed to be cannibals .

References

City-states